The Catalonia College of Music is a music school in Barcelona, Catalonia, Spain.

The school is located at L'Auditori, a performing arts center inaugurated in 1999 which also houses three concert halls and a museum. The school has an international faculty and student body, and includes departments for classical and contemporary music, early music, jazz and popular music, traditional music, musicology and ethnomusicology, theory and composition, music education, music business, and sonology.

Faculty
 Albert Guinovart, composition
 Agusti Charles, composition
 Mauricio Sotelo, composition
 Uxia Martinez Botana , double bass
 Melissa Mercadal, current principal of the college.
 Kennedy Moretti, chamber music professor
 Gary Willis, electric bass
 Xavier Castillo, clarinet
 Lorenzo Coppola, clarinet
 Vera Martínez Mehner, violin
 Johan Duijck, choral conducting
 Lutz Köhler, orchestra conducting
 Pedro Memelsdorff, recorder
 Zoran Dukic, classical guitar+
 Ashan Pillai, viola
 Karst de Jong, theory, improvisation
 Béatrice Martin, harpsichord
 Joaquim Rabaseda, musicology
 Vicens Prats, flute
 Anna Costal, musicology
 Luca Chiantore, musicology

+Former faculty

Performing ensembles
The school has several performing ensembles, including:
 Orquestra i Cor d'Antiga de l'ESMUC (ESMUC early music ensemble and choir).

References

External links

ESMUC official web-site (Catalan, Spanish and English)

Music schools in Spain